The Dunvegan Formation is a stratigraphical unit of Cenomanian age in the Western Canadian Sedimentary Basin.

It takes the name from the settlement of Dunvegan, Alberta, and was first described in an outcrop on Peace River near Dunvegan by George Mercer Dawson in 1881.

Lithology 
The Dunvegan Formation is composed of marine, and deltaic sandstone with thin shale interbeds in the Peace River Country. East of Dunvegan, Alberta it is of marine origin, and in its western reaches in British Columbia it was deposited in a continental facies, where the sandstone becomes more conglomeratic. During Dunvegan time, a brackish water environment was present in the Wapiti River area and south of Grande Prairie, where the formation is porous.

Hydrocarbon production 
The Dunvegan Formation had an initial established recoverable oil reserve of 9.9 million m³, with 3.1 million m³ already produced as of 2008. Gas reserves totaled 18.7 million m³, with 4.5 million m³ already produced.

Distribution 
It occurs south of Fort Nelson and the Liard River in north-east British Columbia, thins out south of the Peace River Country. South of the Athabasca River, the Dunvegan grades laterally into the Blackstone Formation.

The Dunvegan Formation is exposed in outcrop along and near the Peace River east of the foothills, in the Peace River Country and the Chinchaga area, as well as patches in north-western Alberta and south of the Caribou Mountains.

Relationship to other units 
The Dunvegan Formation is conformably overlain by marine shales of the Kaskapau Formation in the Peace River Country and overlies conformably and transitionally the shale of the Fort St. John Group.  The relationship between the Dunvegan and the overlying/underlying units is diachronous and the boundaries of the Dunvegan are placed at the first and last appearances of sandstone within the shale-dominated succession.

References 

Stratigraphy of Alberta
Stratigraphy of British Columbia
Upper Cretaceous Series of North America
Cenomanian Stage
Sandstone formations of Canada
Deltaic deposits
Shallow marine deposits
Reservoir rock formations